The Millennium MH-1 is an American helicopter based on the now out of production Revolution Mini-500 and produced by Millennium Helicopter. The aircraft is supplied as a series of kits for amateur modification of existing Mini 500s and as a new kit to build from scratch.

Design and development
The MH-1 was originally provided as a series of kits to upgrade old Mini-500 airframes, allowing the owner to modify them to MH-1 standards. The remaining kits cover modifications to the main transmission, the tail, main drive and clutch basket, radiator fans and relay and the rotor head. The aircraft can also be built new from a complete kit. In either case the resulting MH-1 complies with the US experimental - amateur-built  rules.

The MH-1 features a single main rotor with a two-bladed tail rotor, a single-seat enclosed cockpit with a windshield and skid-type landing gear.

The Federal Aviation Administration approved the MH-1 conversion as a distinct aircraft type.

Specifications (version)

References

External links

2000s United States sport aircraft
2000s United States helicopters
Homebuilt aircraft
Single-engined piston helicopters